Gabriel Rucker is an American chef and owner of the restaurants Le Pigeon and Little Bird Bistro, in Portland, Oregon. In 2018, he opened his third restaurant—Canard, next door to Le Pigeon, which offers "French bar food".

Early life
Rucker was raised in Napa.

Career
Rucker was a Food & Wine "Best New Chef" in 2007. In 2011, Rucker won the James Beard Rising Star award. He was nominated as "best chef in the Northwest" in 2012.

Bibliography
 Le Pigeon: Cooking at the Dirty Bird (2013)

See also
 James Beard Foundation Award: 2010s

References

Living people
American chefs
American male writers
People from Napa, California
Writers from Portland, Oregon
Year of birth missing (living people)